Wiscoy Creek is a stream, approximately  long, in western New York in the United States. It is a tributary of the Genesee River. The creek was known to Native Americans as O-wa-is-ki, meaning "under the banks".

Course
The Wiscoy rises in the Town of Eagle in Wyoming County. In the hamlet of Bliss the creek is joined by its North Branch, which flows south from its source in the Town of Wethersfield. From there, the creek flows southeast through the village of Pike, and is joined by East Koy Creek shortly before joining the Genesee River in the town of Hume in northern Allegany County.

Trout fishing
Nursed by cold springs, the water temperature in this stream rarely exceeds , enabling the Wiscoy to provide good trout fishing all season long. The stream is managed almost exclusively as a wild trout fishery; the only stretch that is stocked is a  section in Allegany County.

A 2006 New York State Department of Environmental Conservation survey estimated 1,600 adult wild brown trout per stream mile in the Wyoming County section of Wiscoy Creek. The stream typically does not produce large trout due to the high number of fish overall, however a  fish was reported during the survey. Other areas are open by landowner permission.

See also
List of rivers of New York

References

Rivers of New York (state)
Rivers of Wyoming County, New York
Rivers of Allegany County, New York